Michael Esposito may refer to:

 Michael Esposito (paranormal investigator) (born 1964), experimental artist and researcher
 Michael P. Esposito, member of the New Jersey General Assembly

See also
Mike Esposito (disambiguation)